24Seven is a British television series that aired from 2001 to 2002, aired in the UK on CITV and in the US on Noggin's teenage-oriented block The N. The series focused on a group of students living at Discovery House, a dorm at the Oaks Boarding School. All of the storylines focused on the love triangle involving Miles Silverstone, his girlfriend Anya Vicenze, and his brother Chris, who had an eye for Anya. Another major plotline was that of Tally's "celeb" mother, whom Tally constantly boasted about but never came to visit. Another major plotline was that of Bethan and the county running team and qualifying for it.

Samuel Crowder who played Chad, left after series one due to creative differences with the director, stating "I didn't like the direction my character was going in. I was concerned about being typecast as a hipster".

Cast
 Jordan Frieda as Miles Silverstone (Series 1)
 Fiona Wade as Anya Vicenze
 Royce Cronin as Chris Silverstone
Neil Henry as Heinz Otto "Beans" Van Damme
 Pippa Nixon as Jax Duffy
 Hayley Newton as Tallulah "Tally" Hunter
 Sadie Pickering as Bethan Davis
 Augustus Prew as Drew Jessup
 Jack Lloyd-Davies as Vincent "Staggsy" Staggs
 Samuel Crowder as Chad "Curly" Jones (Series 1)
 Roger Davies-Roberts as Jasper

References

External links

ITV children's television shows
The N original programming
British teen drama television series
2000s British children's television series
2001 British television series debuts
2002 British television series endings
English-language television shows
Television series by ITV Studios